Roisin Meaney (born September 1959), is an Irish novelist based in Limerick.

Biography
Roisin Meaney was born in Listowel, County Kerry, though her family moved to Tipperary town before she was one. After that Meaney moved to Limerick and has, one way or another, lived there since, with periods in the US, London and Africa. Meaney qualified as a primary teacher and taught in Dublin before spending two years in Zimbabwe. In London she worked as a copywriter for three years. Back in Ireland she resumed her teaching but also began writing, and in 2001 her first novel, The Daisy Picker, won a Write a Bestseller competition and was published in 2004. Meaney switched to job-sharing to allow more time for writing until, four years later, with three published novels and another on the way she took early retirement from the classroom and became a fulltime writer. Her nineteenth novel, The Book Club was published in June 2021 and she's currently working on the next, due out in summer 2022.

Bibliography
 The Daisy Picker, (2004)
 Putting Out the Stars, (2005)
 Don't Even Think About It, (2006)
 The Last Week of May, (2007)
  See If I Care, (2007) with Judi Curtin
 The People Next Door, (2008)
 Half Seven on a Thursday, (2009)
 Love in the Making, (2010)
 The Things We Do for Love, (2011)
 One Summer, (2012)
 Something in Common, (2013)
 After the Wedding, (2014)
 Two Fridays in April, (2015)
 I'll be Home for Christmas, (2015)
 The Reunion, (2016)
 The Street Where You Live, (2017)
 The Anniversary, (2018)
 The Birthday Party, (2019)
 The Restaurant, (2020)
 It's That Time of Year, (2020)
 The Book Club, (2021)

References and sources

1959 births
21st-century Irish women writers
Writers from Limerick (city)
Living people